The 1918 Copa Aldao was the final match to decide the winner of the Copa Aldao, the 4th. edition of the international competition organised by the Argentine and Uruguayan Associations together. The final was contested by Argentine Racing Club de Avellaneda and Uruguayan club Peñarol.

The match was played at Gimnasia y Esgrima Stadium in Buenos Aires, and Racing beat Peñarol 2–1, winning its second Copa Aldao trophy in three consecutive finals contested.

Qualified teams

Match details

References

1919 in Argentine football
1919 in Uruguayan football
a
a
Football in Buenos Aires